Waterborough is a settlement in Waterborough Parish, New Brunswick, Canada.

History

Notable people

See also
List of communities in New Brunswick

References

Settlements in New Brunswick
Communities in Queens County, New Brunswick